UV usually refers to ultraviolet radiation.

UV may also refer to:

Universities 
 University of Valencia, Spain
 University of Valparaíso, Chile
 University of Victoria, Canada
 University of Vienna, Austria
 University of Vermont, United States
 University of Virginia, United States
 University of the Visayas, Philippines

Political parties 
 Valdostan Union, Italy
 Young Liberals of Norway

Other uses 

 Ganz UV, a Hungarian tram type
 UV mapping, the 3D modeling process of making a 2D image representation of a 3D model
 Unique visitor, a unit for measuring the popularity of a website, often used by the advertising industry
 Unmanned vehicle
 UV, a Korean hip-hop duo starring Yoo Se-yoon and Muzie
 UV Vodka, a brand produced by Phillips Distilling Company
 SM U-5 (Austria-Hungary) (or U-V), the lead boat of the U-5 class of submarines of the Austro-Hungarian Navy
 UV (album)

See also 
 
 Ultraviolet (disambiguation)